La Porte or LaPorte High School may refer to:

 LaPorte High School (Indiana), LaPorte, Indiana
 La Porte High School (Texas), La Porte, Texas